The ScotRail trading name was adopted on 22 September 1983, under manager Chris Green,  British Railways Scottish Region to provide a distinctive brand for the British Rail network in Scotland.

Services
ScotRail was responsible for all passenger services that operated wholly within Scotland. It also operated services across the English border to Carlisle, and from 5 March 1988, took over operation of the Caledonian Sleeper services to London Euston. Services from south of the border via the East Coast and West Coast Main Lines remained the responsibility of  InterCity.

Infrastructure
The Ayrshire Coast Line was electrified in September 1986, as was the North Berwick Line in July 1991.

Rolling stock
During its tenure, much of Scotland's locomotive hauled passenger carriage fleet was replaced by Class 150, Class 156 and Class 158 diesel multiple units. It also introduced cascaded Class 305s as well as new Class 318 and Class 320 electric multiple units.

Liveries
When formed in 1983, customised versions of the existing British Rail liveries were adopted, with passenger locomotives and coaching stock painted in a lightly modified version of the InterCity Executive livery. The red stripe was replaced with a saltire blue stripe, and the InterCity name was replaced with the ScotRail name. Most locomotives carried the standard InterCity Executive livery but with ScotRail branding. Diesel and Electric multiple units carried normal versions of the Regional Railways livery. In the SPT area, rolling stock was painted in Strathclyde Orange and Black.

References

Further reading

British Rail brands
Railway companies established in 1983
Railway companies disestablished in 1997
Railway companies of Scotland
Rail transport in Scotland
1983 establishments in Scotland
1997 disestablishments in Scotland
British companies established in 1983
British companies disestablished in 1997